The Palestinian Struggle Youth Union is a youth organization in the Palestinian territories. It is the youth wing of the Palestinian Popular Struggle Front. Razak an-Namurah is the president of the organization.

References

Palestine Liberation Organization
Youth wings of Palestinian political parties